Dunaharaszti Munkás Testedző Kör is a professional football club based in Dunaharaszti, Pest County, Hungary, that competes in the Nemzeti Bajnokság III, the third tier of Hungarian football.

Name changes
1920–36: Dunaharaszti Munkás Testedző Kör
1936–38: Dunaharaszti AC
1938–45: Dunaharaszti SC
1945–52: Dunaharaszti Munkás Testedző Kör
1952: merger with Csepel Autógyári Vasas
1959: 
1959–present: Dunaharaszti Munkás Testedző Kör

External links
 Official website of Dunaharaszti MTK
 Profile on Magyar Futball

References

Football clubs in Hungary
Association football clubs established in 1920
1920 establishments in Hungary